Chondrostylis is a plant genus of the family Euphorbiaceae first described as a genus in 1897. It is native to Thailand, Peninsular Malaysia, Sumatra and Borneo.

Species
 Chondrostylis bancana Boerl. - Bangka, Kalimantan Tengah 
 Chondrostylis kunstleri (King ex Hook.f.) Airy Shaw - S Thailand, W Malaysia, Borneo, Sumatra

References

Agrostistachydeae
Euphorbiaceae genera
Taxa named by Jacob Gijsbert Boerlage